Northside Wizards are a basketball club in Brisbane, Queensland, with both men's and women's teams competing in the Australian NBL1 North basketball league.

Club History

Background 
The club became known as Northside Wizards Basketball in 2005. Originally formed in 1935 as the Brisbane Women's Basketball Club, the club changed its name to Brisbane Men’s and Women’s Basketball in 1951, the Brisbane Community Basketball Association in 1990, and the Brisbane Men’s & Women’s Basketball Association Inc. in 1993.

NBL1 North (formerly QBL) 
NBL1 is the semi-professional basketball league in Australia, and consists of men's and women's competition across South, North, Central, West and East Conferences. NBL1 North was formerly known as the Queensland Basketball League (QBL), comprising teams across Queensland and Northern Territory. 

In 2022, the Northside Wizards Men's team made it to the Semi-Finals where they lost against the Gold Coast Rollers 108-85. Team members included Mitch McCarron, Anthony Drmic, Keanu Pinder, Kevin White, Lual Diing, and Cameron Thew. 

In 2022, the Northside Wizards Women's team made it to the Quarter-Finals where they lost against the Brisbane Capitals 81-66. Team members included Tiana Mangakahia, Shyla Heal. Tiana Mangakahia was named 2022 Most Valuable Player, and Shyla Heal was named NBL1 North Youth Women’s Player of the Year.

References

External links

1935 establishments in Australia
Basketball teams established in 1935
Basketball teams in Queensland
Sporting clubs in Brisbane
Queensland Basketball League teams